Obi Henry Ezeagwuna II was a Nigerian royal and the traditional leader of Issele-Uku.

He died in a traffic collision on August 9, 2014.

References

Year of birth missing
2014 deaths
Nigerian royalty